Chep Nuñez (1964December 8, 1990) was an Dominican-born American music producer, editor and mixer. He reached chart success with the group 2 Puerto Ricans, a Blackman, and a Dominican (Nuñez was the Dominican); but he worked on literally hundreds of hip hop, Latin freestyle, and house-music records.

References 

1964 births
1990 deaths
American record producers
Remixers
American people of Dominican Republic descent
20th-century American businesspeople